Terence Twigger  (born 21 November 1949) is a British businessman. He was the chief executive (CEO) of Meggitt plc, a British engineering business specialising in aerospace equipment, from 2001 to May 2013.

Early life
He has a bachelor's degree in Economics and Accountancy from Bristol University. After leaving university he worked for Deloitte & Touche for five years, during which time he qualified as a chartered accountant.

Career
He was CEO of Meggitt from January 2001 to May 2013, having joined the company in 1993, and serving as finance director since 1995. Before that, he spent 15 years with Lucas Aerospace, rising to finance director.

Since 2013, Twigger has been the chairman of Auctus Industries, which he co-founded  with Valerio Massimo di Roccasecca and Edward Spencer Churchill.

He is a non-executive director of Filtrona plc and senior non-executive director of XP Power plc.

He is a fellow of the Institute of Chartered Accountants in England and Wales and a member of the Society of British Aerospace Companies and the Royal Aeronautical Society.

References

1949 births
Living people
British accountants
British chief executives
British corporate directors